Nick Warburton (born 1947) is a British screenwriter and playwright. He has written stage plays, television and radio scripts for series including Doctors, Holby City and EastEnders.

Career
Warburton was a primary school teacher for ten years before deciding to become a full-time writer.

He has been part of the regular writing team on Holby City since 2001. His radio plays, On Mardle Fen, are one of the few recurring series on BBC Radio 4's Afternoon Play strand. His play Beast won the 2005 Tinniswood Award. Setting a Glass was shortlisted for the Tinniswood Award for a drama broadcast in 2010. Witness, an adaptation of the Gospel of St Luke, won the Sandford St Martin Trust Radio Premier award in 2009.

He also wrote a screenwriting manual, Writing for TV and Radio: A Writers' and Artists' Companion, in 2015 with Sue Teddern.

References

External links

1947 births
Living people
English screenwriters
English male screenwriters
English radio writers
English television writers
English soap opera writers
English dramatists and playwrights
English male dramatists and playwrights
British soap opera writers
British television writers
British male dramatists and playwrights
British instructional writers
Screenwriting instructors
British male television writers